Bandolero was a French band best known for its 1983 dance hit "Paris Latino". The group was composed of the two brothers Carlos and José Perez (both formerly of the punk rock band Guilty Razors) and Jill Merme-Bourezak.

Discography

Singles

Citations

External links 

 

Musical groups established in 1983
French pop music groups
French dance music groups
French funk musical groups